Tutume McConnell Community College  is a government Institution located in Tutume, Botswana.

See also 

 Education in Botswana
 Mathangwane Village

References 

Schools in Botswana